Kumi Kumi (from Swahili 'kumi' for 'ten') is an illegal liquor brewed in Kenya from sorghum, maize or millet. The cheap, widely brewed drink grows in popularity among the lower classes and disadvantaged of the region, as the economy and the value of the shilling has declined. Kumi Kumi is known for its exceptional alcohol content.

Kumi Kumi is so named for its cheap price, KSh.10/= for a mug, which in 2006 comes to roughly US$0.15. Legal beers usually cost around KSh.65/=.

Health concerns
The brew is often doctored in unsafe and poisonous ways, and its regular abuse frequently has resulted in alcohol poisoning related hospitalizations, blindness, and death.

Notes

Distilled drinks
Food and drink in Kenya
Drugs in Kenya
Alcohol in Kenya
Adulteration